is a Japanese actress, entertainer and model who is represented by Platinum Production. She is known for her roles as Kanon Fukami/Kamen Rider Kanon Specter in Kamen Rider Ghost (2015-2016) and Sayo Oharu/Kiramai Pink in Mashin Sentai Kiramager (2020–2021).

Biography
Kudo started modeling when she was in fourth grade in elementary school.

She was part of Charm Kids as Mana Fujitani until August 1, 2012. On September 16, she announced that she would revert to her birth name. She is currently part of Platinum Production and enrolled in Pisca.

Works

Video

Filmography

Television

Film

Web series

References

External links
Official profile 
 

Japanese television personalities
Japanese female models
21st-century Japanese actresses
1999 births
Living people
Actresses from Tokyo
Models from Tokyo Metropolis